Warth is a town in the district of Neunkirchen in the Austrian state of Lower Austria.

It consists of seven localities (in brackets population as of 1 January 2016):
 Haßbach (227)
 Kirchau (294)
 Kulm (70)
 Petersbaumgarten (266)
 Steyersberg (75)
 Thann (42)
 Warth (547)

Population

Notable people
The philosopher Ludwig Wittgenstein briefly taught at a secondary school in Haßbach in the autumn of 1922.

References

Cities and towns in Neunkirchen District, Austria
Bucklige Welt